Accrington is a town in Hyndburn, Lancashire, England.  It contains 43 listed buildings, which are designated by Historic England and recorded in the National Heritage List for England. Of these, two are listed at Grade II*, the middle grade, and the others are at Grade II.

Until the arrival of industry in the later part of the 18th century the area was rural, containing only small settlements.  Most of the older listed buildings are, or originated as, farmhouses or farm buildings.  There is one surviving industrial building, a former engineering workshop, that has been listed.  Many of the other listed buildings are associated with the development of a substantial town, and with its road and rail links.  The buildings associated with transport are a former coaching inn (now a public house), a road toll house, and a railway viaduct.  A number of public and commercial buildings are listed, including the town hall, the public library, the former mechanics' institute, a market hall, a shopping arcade, and a former bank.  The other listed buildings include large houses, some of which have been adapted for other purposes, a political club, churches, and memorials.  The newest buildings to have been listed are a complex consisting of a fire station, magistrates' courts, and a police station, which were built in the 1930s.

Key

Buildings

References

Citations

Sources

Lists of listed buildings in Lancashire
Buildings and structures in Hyndburn
Listed